Gamma-tubulin complex component 5 is a protein that in humans is encoded by the TUBGCP5 gene.
It is part of the gamma tubulin complex, which required for microtubule nucleation at the centrosome.

See also
Tubulin
 TUBGCP2
 TUBGCP3
 TUBGCP4
 TUBGCP6

References

Further reading